The Columbia Enforcers can refer to either:

A team slated to begin playing in the Women's Spring Football League based in Columbia, Missouri set to begin play for 2011. The team never materialized.
A men's American football team in Columbia, South Carolina, to play in the Professional Developmental Football League.

External links
Columbia Enforcers

Sports teams in Columbia, Missouri
American football teams in Missouri
Women's Spring Football League teams